Orphan Black is a Canadian science fiction thriller television series created by screenwriter Graeme Manson and director John Fawcett, starring Tatiana Maslany as several identical people who are clones.

Total nominations and awards for the cast

ACTRA Toronto Awards
The ACTRA Toronto Awards are given annually by the Alliance of Canadian Cinema, Television and Radio Artists, recognizing outstanding performances by its members. Orphan Black has one win from seven nominations.

Canadian Cinema Editors Awards
The Canadian Cinema Editors is a non-profit organization which promotes the art and science of picture editing in all media, they host annual awards honouring professional film editors. Orphan Black received four nominations with one win.

Canadian Screen Awards
The Canadian Screen Awards are given annually by the Academy of Canadian Cinema & Television recognizing excellence in Canadian film, English-language television, and digital media. Orphan Black has been honoured with 35 awards from 54 nominations.

Constellation Awards
The Constellation Awards were a set of Canadian awards given annually for the best science fiction or fantasy works, the winners were determined by voting by the general public. Orphan Black won four awards from five nominations.

Critics' Choice Television Awards
The Critics' Choice Television Awards are presented annually by Broadcast Television Journalists Association. Orphan Black has received two awards from four nominations.

Directors Guild of Canada Awards
The Directors Guild of Canada hosts an annual awards ceremony recognizing achievement in directing, production design, picture and sound editing.

Dorian Awards
The Dorian Awards are organized by the Gay and Lesbian Entertainment Critics Association. Orphan Black has been nominated four times.

Edgar Allan Poe Awards
The Edgar Allan Poe Awards are presented every year by the Mystery Writers of America, they honor the best in mystery fiction, non-fiction, television, film, and theatre. Orphan Black has been nominated once.

Emmy Awards
The Emmy Awards recognizes excellence in television production and is considered one of the top honors in the industry.  Orphan Black has earned three nominations, resulting in one award.

EWwy Awards
The EWwys honoured the Emmy-snubbed shows and actors of the year. Orphan Black won three awards from five nominations.

GLAAD Media Awards
The GLAAD Media Awards are awarded annually by the Gay & Lesbian Alliance Against Defamation. Orphan Black has three nominations.

Golden Globe Awards
The Golden Globe Award is an accolade bestowed by the 93 members of the Hollywood Foreign Press Association recognizing excellence in film and television, both domestic and foreign. Orphan Black has received one nomination.

Gracie Awards
The Gracie Allen Awards are awarded annually, recognizing exemplary programming created by women, for women and about women in all facets of media and entertainment. Orphan Black has one award.

Hugo Awards
The Hugo Awards are a set of awards given annually for the best science fiction or fantasy works. Orphan Black has accepted one award, with two nominations.

IGN Awards
The IGN Awards are chosen annually by the IGN editors, honoring the best in film, television, games, comics and anime. Orphan Black has two wins from eight nominations.

IGN People's Choice Awards
The IGN People's Choice Awards are voted on annually by the general public, they honor the best in film, television, games, comics and anime. Orphan Black has one award.

Peabody Awards
The Peabody Awards honor the most powerful, enlightening, and invigorating stories in television, radio, and online media. Orphan Black has received one award.

People's Choice Awards
The People's Choice Awards is an American awards show recognizing the people and the work of popular culture. The show has been held annually since 1975 and is voted on by the general public. Orphan Black has been nominated twice.

Prix Aurora Awards
The Prix Aurora Awards are annual Canadian awards given out to the best works of science fiction and fantasy.

Satellite Awards
The Satellite Awards are a set of annual awards given by the International Press Academy. Orphan Black has four nominations.

Screen Actors Guild Awards
The Screen Actors Guild Awards are organized by the Screen Actors Guild‐American Federation of Television and Radio Artists. First awarded in 1995, the awards aim to recognize excellent achievements in film and television. Orphan Black has one nomination.

TCA Awards
The members of the Television Critics Association vote annually for outstanding achievements in television. Orphan Black has one award from three nominations.

Tubey Awards

TV Guide Awards
The TV Guide Awards are annual awards created by the editors of TV Guide magazine, as a readers poll to honor outstanding programs and performers in the American television industry. Orphan Black has been nominated twice.

Writers Guild of Canada Awards
The Writers Guild of Canada represents English-language screenwriters in Canada, their annual awards honour excellence in screenwriting. Orphan Black has earned three awards from five nominations.

Young Artist Awards
The Young Artist Awards are awarded annually to young actors in film and television. Orphan Black has received one nomination.

Young Hollywood Awards
The Young Hollywood Awards were awards presented annually which honor the year's biggest achievements in pop music, movies, sports, television, fashion and more, as voted on by teenagers and young adults. Orphan Black has one award.

References

Orphan Black